Ken Flach and Robert Seguso were the defending champions but lost in the quarterfinals to Broderick Dyke and Wally Masur.

Kevin Curren and Guy Forget won in the final 6–2, 7–6 against Darren Cahill and Mark Kratzmann.

Seeds

Draw

Final

Top half

Bottom half

External links
1986 Stella Artois Championships Doubles Draw

Doubles